Bravicea is a village in Călărași District, Moldova.

At the Bravicea school (500 students), one in four students has at least one parent working abroad; many live with their grandparents, some alone. Alexei Zatic has been the mayor of the village since 2007.

Gallery

References

External links 
 
 Migration and the economic crisis
 Troita din satul Bravicea

Villages of Călărași District
Populated places established in 1603
1603 establishments in Europe
Orgeyevsky Uyezd